This is a list of United States ambassadors to the African Union.

Ambassadors

References

External links 
 Official website
 Representatives of the U.S.A. to the African Union

African Union
United States–African relations
 
Permanent Representatives to the African Union